Maui Veterans Highway or Route 311 (formerly Mokulele Highway) is a highway on the island of Maui in Hawaii that runs south through the isthmus of Maui from the town of Kahului and nearby Kahului Airport, Maui's international airport, to Kihei, a distance of approximately . Most of the highway passes through sugarcane fields. Its name was changed from Mokulele Highway to the current name in April 2017 when Governor David Ige signed a bill passed by both houses of the Legislature without opposition.

Route description
The highway begins as a continuation of Puunene Road South leaving Kahului, then passes through what is known as the "Puunene" area of Maui as Route 311 and 350 combined. It continues south through agricultural land and intersects the Piilani Highway as it nears the Kealia Pond National Wildlife Refuge, ending shortly after at its junction with South Kihei Road on the north side of Kihei.

Major intersections

See also

 List of state highways in Hawaii
 List of highways numbered 311

References

External links

0311
Transportation in Maui County, Hawaii